Senator Keating may refer to:

Bill Keating (politician) (born 1952), Massachusetts State Senate
Frank Keating (born 1944), Oklahoma State Senate
Kenneth Keating (1900–1975), New York State Senate